Anton Vladimirovich Shunin (born 27 January 1987) is a Russian footballer who plays as a goalkeeper for Dynamo Moscow and the Russian national team.

Club career
Shunin is a youth product of Dynamo Moscow. He made his debut on 21 April 2007 in a 2–1 win over Khimki.

On 17 November 2012, Shunin was struck by a firecracker thrown from the stands during a Russian Premier League match against FC Zenit Saint Petersburg. After the match had been stopped, it was confirmed that Shunin had sustained a burn of the cornea in one eye.

He was voted as player of the month for November 2019 by Dynamo fans.

On 4 August 2020, he was voted Player of the Year by Dynamo fans for the 2019–20 season, the prize he also won in 2018–19. He was voted player of the month again for August 2020 and September 2020.

On 16 November 2021, he extended his contract until the end of the 2023–24 season.

International career
 He made his international debut on 22 August 2007 in a friendly match which ended 2–2 against Poland.

After a three-year break, he was called up for the national team again for a friendly game against Belgium on 17 November 2010.

He was confirmed for the finalized UEFA Euro 2012 squad on 25 May 2012.

After another 6 years without call-ups, he was included in the squad for the games against Turkey and Czech Republic in September 2018, two months after then retirement of goalkeeper Igor Akinfeev from international football. He played his first competitive match for his country on 19 November 2019 in a Euro 2020 qualifier against San Marino, keeping a clean sheet.

In the UEFA Nations League in 2020, Shunin gradually became the first choice goalkeeper of the national team.

On 11 May 2021, he was included in the preliminary extended 30-man squad for UEFA Euro 2020. On 2 June 2021, he was included in the final squad. He played the opening game against Belgium as Russia lost 0–3. He did not appear in the remaining games as Russia was eliminated at group stage.

Personal life
Shunin has a son named Artemy (born 2012) with his first wife, Veronica. In July 2018, Anton Shunin married Russian model, Kate Grigorieva. Their daughter Sofia was born on 22 May 2020.

Career statistics

Club

International

Honours

Club
Dynamo Moscow
FNL: 2016–17

Individual
List of top 33 players in the Russian Premier League: 2011–12 (3rd place)

References

External links
 Club profile 
 Shunin's Instagram account

1987 births
Footballers from Moscow
Living people
Russian footballers
Russia under-21 international footballers
Russia national football B team footballers
Russia international footballers
FC Dynamo Moscow players
Association football goalkeepers
Russian Premier League players
Russian First League players
UEFA Euro 2012 players
UEFA Euro 2020 players